The Palestine Jewish Colonization Association, commonly known by its Yiddish acronym PICA, was established in 1924. It played a major role in purchasing land for the Jewish settlement in Palestine and later the State of Israel until the association disbandment in 1957.

The Jewish Colonization Association (JCA or ICA) was founded by Bavarian philanthropist Baron Maurice de Hirsch in 1891 to help Jews from Russia and Romania to settle in Argentina. Baron de Hirsch died in 1896 and thereafter the JCA began to also assist the Jewish settlement in Palestine. At the end of 1899 Edmond James de Rothschild transferred title to his colonies in Palestine plus fifteen million francs to the JCA. In 1924 the JCA branch dealing with colonies in Palestine was reorganised by Baron de Rothschild as the Palestine Jewish Colonization Association, under the direction of his son James Armand de Rothschild.

After the 1929 Palestine riots PICA helped to rehabilitate agricultural colonies that had been damaged.

James de Rothschild, who died in 1957, instructed in his will that PICA should transfer most of its land in Israel to the Jewish National Fund. On December 31, 1958 PICA agreed to vest its right to land holdings in Syria and Lebanon in the State of Israel.

See also
Jewish Colonization Association

References

Bibliography
Avneri, Arieh (1984). The Claim of Dispossession: Jewish Land-settlement and the Arabs, 1878-1948. Transaction Publishers. 
Brandeis, Louis Dembitz (1973). Letters of Louis D Brandeis. SUNY Press. 
Fischbach, Michael R. (2003). Records of Dispossession. Palestinian Refugee Property and the Arab-Israeli Conflict.  Columbia University Press. 
Norman, Theodore (1985). An Outstretched Arm: A History of the Jewish Colonization Association. London: Routledge & Kegan Paul.

External links 

Israeli Ministry of Foreign Affairs, The Redeemers of the Land, 18 October 1999, accessed 1 June 2007.
UNISPAL, Report on Immigration, Land Settlement and Development, Sir John Hope Simpson, Presented by the Secretary of State for the Colonies to Parliament by Command of His Majesty, October, 1930.

Zionist organizations
Jewish organizations in Mandatory Palestine
Organizations established in 1924
1957 disestablishments in Israel
Edmond James de Rothschild